Welcome, Chaos is a novel by Kate Wilhelm published in 1983.

Plot summary
Welcome, Chaos is a novel in which the heroine is manipulated to a far-away place involving an immortality virus.

Reception
Dave Langford reviewed Welcome, Chaos for White Dwarf #77, and stated that "Wilhelm maintains tight suspense and high-class characterization to the bitter end. . . nor does she shirk the moral issues."

Reviews
Review by Debbie Notkin (1983) in Locus, #271 August 1983
Review by Baird Searles (1984) in Isaac Asimov's Science Fiction Magazine, March 1984
Review by Tom Easton (1984) in Analog Science Fiction/Science Fact, May 1984
Review by Algis Budrys (1985) in The Magazine of Fantasy & Science Fiction, July 1985
Review by Don D'Ammassa (1985) in Science Fiction Chronicle, #73 October 1985
Review by Chris Bailey (1986) in Vector 133

References

1983 novels